Exmouth Rugby Football Club is a rugby union team based in at the Imperial Recreation Ground in Exmouth, Devon . The club runs four senior teams and a ladies side as well as the full range of junior boys teams and girls teams at three age levels. The first XV plays in South West Premier, the fifth tier of the English rugby union league system.

History
Exmouth RFC was formed in 1873 and, along with clubs such as Barnstaple and Exeter, were instrumental in promoting the game of rugby union in Devon.  Early games were played at Exmouth Cricket Ground and then Littleham Lane, until the club moved to more permanent lodgings at Archery Field (Cranford), where they would remain for the next 70 years.  The club had some difficult times in its infancy, almost fading from existence in the early 20th century and having to merge with another local club (the Exmouth Echoes) in 1905.

By the 1920s things had improved considerably and Exmouth became one of the top sides in the county, with the first team winning the Devon Senior Cup in 1925 and reserves winning the Devon Junior Cup three times between 1920 and 1926.  Although the success of the 1920s was not reflected in the decades before and after the Second World War, there were some moments of note including a home victory over a Swansea side. In the 1960s Exmouth decided to leave Cranford to a more suitable location in town so that they were more accessible to supporters.  In 1964 the club moved to its current home at the Imperial Recreation Ground, where it has remained to this day.

When the leagues were introduced in 1987-88 Exmouth were placed in Cornwall/Devon at level 8 of the English rugby union system.  Although they were relegated to the Devon regional leagues at the end of 1988-89 they bounced back quickly and spent the remainder of the 1990s in Cornwall/Devon. At the end of the millennium Exmouth finally escaped from level 8 by winning promotion to Western Counties West.  The club also won the Devon Junior Cup twice during this period, including a league and cup double in 2000.

During the early 21st century Exmouth started to rise up the league structure and become one of the counties premier sides.  They achieved promotion from Western Counties West at the end of 2002 and also won the clubs' first Devon Senior Cup title since 1925.  A second promotion at the end of 2008, this time from South West 2 West, saw Exmouth reach the lofty heights of level 5 rugby.

On reaching level 5 Exmouth embarked on their most successful spell in the club's history, winning promotion to National League 2 South twice (at tier 4, the highest level the club has reached), and becoming dominant in county rugby with five senior cup victories, including four in row between 2010 and 2014.   The only downside during this period was that the club was unable to remain in National League 2 South for longer than a season on each occasion they were promoted to that league.

Ground
Exmouth RFC play at the Imperial Recreation Ground on the banks of the River Exe, just off the Royal Avenue  in the heart of Exmouth.  As it is next to Exmouth railway station it is easily accessible to supporters and there is plenty of parking, both inside and outside the ground.   The ground consists of two enclosed pitches.  The main pitch is surrounded by an athletics track and is next to the club-house and there is a covered grand stand.  Capacity is around 1,250, which includes 250 in the stand, and a further 1,000 standing pitch side.  The second pitch is for 2nd XV and junior games.

Season summary

Honours
 Devon Junior Cup winners (6): 1920, 1922, 1926, 1938, 1998, 2000
 Devon Senior Cup winners (8): 1925, 2003, 2006, 2011, 2012, 2013, 2014, 2016
 Havill Plate winners (3): 1977, 1981, 1983
 Devon League 1 champions: 1989–90
 Cornwall & Devon champions: 1999–00
 Western Counties West champions: 2001–02 
 Tribute South West Division 2 West champions: 2007–08 
 National League 3 (south-east v south-west) promotion play-off winner: 2012–13
 National League 3 South West champions: 2015–16

Notes

See also
 Devon RFU

References

External links
 Official website
 Official Twitter Account

English rugby union teams
Rugby clubs established in 1873
Rugby union in Devon
Exmouth